Rangaa Patangaa (Marathi: रंगा पतंगा) is a Marathi-language Indian film released in 2016. The movie stars Makarand Anaspure and Sandeep Pathak in the lead role, while Nandita Dhuri, Gauri Konge, Bharat Ganeshpure reprises the supporting cast.

Plot
Jumman beloved oxen ranga is stolen from his home  so he and his friend start searching him

Cast 
 Makarand Anaspure as Jumman
 Sandeep Pathak as Popat
 Hardeek Joshi as ACP Pathak
 Nandita Dhuri
 Bharat Ganeshpure
 Suhas Palshikar
 Gauri Konge
 Abhay Mahajan
 Anand Kekan

Soundtrack 
The film features two songs, both composed by Kaushal Inamdar and sung by Adarsh Shinde. The lyrics of the songs have been written by Ilahi Jamdar.

Awards
The film won several awards in many international film festivals, including Best Film and Best Director in the Pune International Films festival in 2016.

References

2016 films
2010s Marathi-language films